"Habla Blah Blah" ("Talk Blah Blah") is a song by Mexican recording artist Gloria Trevi, it was released by Universal Music Latino as the fifth single from her ninth studio album De Película (2013) on August 1, 2014.

Charts

Certification

References 

2013 songs
2014 singles
Spanish-language songs
Universal Music Latino singles
Gloria Trevi songs
Record Report Top 100 number-one singles
Record Report Top Latino number-one singles
Songs written by Gloria Trevi